Zbigniew Ślusarski (born 18 May 1947) is a Polish rower. He competed in the men's coxless pair event at the 1976 Summer Olympics.

References

External links
 

1947 births
Living people
Polish male rowers
Olympic rowers of Poland
Rowers at the 1976 Summer Olympics
People from Chełmno County
World Rowing Championships medalists for Poland